Dactylopteryx is the type genus of praying mantids in the revived family Dactylopterygidae. The oldest documented instance of the species appeared in "Annual issues of the Association for Patriotic Natural History in Württemberg", by Werner Karl Frederick Hall.

Species
The Mantodea Species File lists:
 Dactylopteryx flexuosa Karsch, 1892
 Dactylopteryx intermedia Beier, 1963
 Dactylopteryx orientalis Werner, 1906

References

Liturgusidae
Mantodea genera